A Ranger or Ranger Guide is a member of a section of some Guiding organisations who is between the ages of 14–18. It is the female-centred equivalent of the Rover Scouts.

Early history

Girl Guiding had officially been founded in 1910 in the United Kingdom. By 1916–17, it had become apparent that girls who had been Girl Guides from the start were getting too old for their companies, and that older girls wished to become Guides but did not fit well in companies of younger girls. "Senior Guides" slowly came into existence as some captains (adult leaders of companies) formed patrols of girls over 16 years old. Robert Baden-Powell, the founder of Scouting and Guiding, was interested in this development and in June 1917 asked Rose Kerr to take on responsibility for them, outlining to her a plan for them. The scheme for the Senior Guides was published in parts in 1918.

In the next two years, many suggestions of name change were discussed but no consensus was reached. Rose Kerr recounts a conversation with Robert Baden-Powell in 1920 where he suggested "Ranger", one of the rejected suggestions for the Senior Scouts (by then called Rovers). In June 1920, Olave Baden-Powell, then the Chief Guide, wrote:

The name received approval at a Conference of County Commissioners in July 1920, and was thereafter the official name.

Girlguiding UK

Rangers have a long history in the United Kingdom, but their name was changed to "Senior Section", but has now been changed back. In Girlguiding UK, Rangers is replacing The Senior Section (TSS). Rangers can belong to Units in the same way as Rainbows, Brownies or Guides belong to Units. Rangers is open to girls from 14 to 18 years old. They can pursue any or all of several schemes including The King's Guide and the Duke of Edinburgh's Award.

Previously, there were also Sea Rangers and Air Rangers.

Members of Rangers often play a wider role in the running of Girlguiding as they take on additional responsibilities. Many members of Rangers are assistant or unit leaders for other sections (Rainbows, Brownies, Guides), train as Peer Educators and deliver training to younger sections and their own section on topics such as Mental Health and, Division/ District/ County Commissioners and Advisors, Trainers and Trustees.

Members of Rangers hold a seat on the National Committees. This is often the chair of the youth representation body (Polaris is Scotland, Pegasus in Ulster). Any member of Rangers over the age of 16 can join these groups and provide a voice for the members of the organisation on key issues. Girlguiding also holds seats in the Scottish Youth Parliament and the British Youth Council, these positions are held by a member of Rangers.

In Girlguiding UK, the terms The Senior Section, Rangers and Ranger Guides are often used interchangeably.

The Rangers promise is the same as that of the Guides:

GirlGuiding New Zealand

In GirlGuiding New Zealand, Rangers are girls between 14 and 18. The Ranger's mascot is called Woozle.

When Rangers reach the age of 18 many become Rovers which are part of the Scout movement and many do this as well as being leaders in the Guide movement.

See also

References

 
 
 

Girl Guiding and Girl Scouting
Girlguiding